Richard Durnford (3 November 1802 – 14 October 1895) was the Bishop of Chichester from 1870 to 1895.

He was born in Newbury, Berkshire, into an ecclesiastical family (his father was also named Richard Dunford). He was educated at Eton and Magdalen College, Oxford, and ordained in 1831.

Durnford took a position as tutor to Edward Vernon Harbord, for which he was recommended by Stephen Lushington. With a presentation from Edward Harbord, 3rd Baron Suffield, he was then from 1835 rector of Middleton, Lancashire. He became its rural dean.

In 1840 he married Emma, the daughter of his old Eton headmaster, John Keate. In 1867 he became Archdeacon of Manchester and in the following year canon residentiary at Manchester Cathedral. In 1870 he was elevated to the episcopate of Chichester.

He died in Basel. His body was brought back to Chichester Cathedral for a funeral service, and then interred at Westhampnett.

Durnford House at Brighton College was named after him. The Durnford House at Eton is named after his brother, Francis Edward Durnford, who taught there from 1839–1877.

Notes 

1802 births
1895 deaths
Burials in Sussex
Bishops of Chichester
Alumni of Magdalen College, Oxford
People educated at Eton College
Archdeacons of Manchester
People from Newbury, Berkshire
19th-century Church of England bishops
Presidents of the Oxford Union